The Guignicourt–Rethel railway was a  long narrow gauge and metre gauge railway in the north of France, commissioned in 1904/05. Three sections were closed in 1940, 1947 and 1961, while the remainder was re-gauged in 1971 and operated as a standard gauge railway until 1987.

History 
The Guignicourt–Neufchâtel section of the secondary railway line of the Chemins de fer de la banlieue de Reims with a track gauge of 1000 mm was opened in 1904 and extended to Rethel in 1905.

The Évergnicourt-Vieux-lès-Asfeld section was closed in 1940, the Vieux-lès-Asfeld-Asfeld section in 1947 and the Asfeld-Rethel section finally in 1961. Only the remaining Guignicourt-Evergnicourt section was converted to standard gauge in 1917 and operated until 1987.

Rail track 
Vignol rails with a weight per metre of 25 kg/m on wooden sleepers were used for the superstructure of the Rethel-Asfeld line, while Vignol rails with a weight per metre of 22 kg/m on wooden sleepers were used for the neighbouring Asfeld-Dizy metre-gauge line of the Chemins de fer départementaux des Ardennes, which opened in 1909.

Rolling stock 
In 1958, the following rolling stock was used on the line by the sugar factory at Acy-Romance:

Six Corpet-Louvet 1'C 19.5 tonne steam locomotives from the  CA (Nos. 61, 71, 77, 79, 81).
Two Corpet-Louvet steam locomotives C with 18 t from the CBR
One Corpet-Louvet steam locomotive 1'C with 19.5 t from the CBR
Two three-axle diesel locomotives with 180 hp Willème engines and Minerva six-speed transmission 0-3-0 with 16 t (no. 651 and 652) and one 0-3-0 with 18 t (no. 301), all formerly Compagnie Générale des Voies Ferrées d'Intérêt Local (VFIL) in Pas-de-Calais
A light HAWA railcar (Hannoversche Waggonfabrik in Hannover) of the CA.
Approximately 150 open freight wagons and about 30 closed wagons with an empty weight of 5 to 6 t for 10 t to 15 t load capacity
Some German bogie wagons with an empty weight of 12 t and a carrying capacity of 20 t

Train stations

References 

Railway lines in Grand Est
Metre gauge railways in France